Kitahiroshima may refer to:

 Kitahiroshima, Hokkaido
 Kitahiroshima, Hiroshima